Iñaki Aiarzagüena (born 30 July 1969) is a Spanish former road cyclist, who competed as a professional from 1992 to 1998. He competed in four editions of the Vuelta a España.

Major results
1991
 1st Memorial Valenciaga
1996
 1st Memorial Manuel Galera
 1st Txitxarro Igoera
 4th Overall Vuelta a La Rioja
1st Stage 1b (TTT)
 10th Subida al Naranco
1998
 4th Subida al Naranco
 9th Overall Volta a Portugal

References

External links

1969 births
Living people
Spanish male cyclists
Cyclists from the Basque Country (autonomous community)
People from Durangaldea
Sportspeople from Biscay